Neil Thomas may refer to:

 Neil Thomas (Canadian football) (born c. 1940), Canadian football player
 Neil Thomas (gymnast) (born 1968), English Olympic gymnast